SC Freiburg II is the reserve team of German association football club SC Freiburg, based in Freiburg, Baden-Württemberg. The team played as SC Freiburg Amateure until 2005.

The team has reached the first round of the DFB-Pokal, the German Cup, once, in 2001–02. They were promoted to the 3. Liga for the first time in 2021, after winning the Regionalliga Südwest.

History
The club's reserve team for the most part of its history played in the lower amateur leagues. It made a three-season appearance in the tier four Verbandsliga Südbaden from 1983 to 1986, with a third place in 1985 as its best result, but then took until 1994 to return to this league. In 1998 the team won promotion to the Oberliga Baden-Württemberg after a league championship in the Verbandsliga.

SC Freiburg II spent the next ten seasons at this level as an upper table side, never finishing outside the top seven, before another league championship in 1998 took the team to the Regionalliga Süd. After four seasons at this league the team became part of the new Regionalliga Südwest in 2012. After a seventh place in its first season in the league the team finished runner-up in 2013–14 but declined the right to take part in the promotion round to the 3. Liga and instead remained in the Regionalliga. At the end of the 2015–16 season Freiburg was relegated back to the Oberliga.

A South Baden Cup win in 2001 qualified it for the first round of the 2001–02 DFB-Pokal, the German Cup, where it lost to FC Schalke 04.

After a 1–1 draw vs. SV Elversberg on 5 June 2021, SC Freiburg II confirmed their promotion to the 2021–22 3. Liga.

Honours
 Regionalliga Südwest
 Winners: 2021
 Runners-up: 2014
Oberliga Baden-Württemberg
 Winners: 2008,2017
Verbandsliga Südbaden
 Winners: 1998
 Runners-up: 1996
South Baden Cup
 Winners: 2001
 Runners-up: 2005

Recent seasons
The recent season-by-season performance of the club:

 With the introduction of the Regionalligas in 1994 and the 3. Liga in 2008 as the new third tier, below the 2. Bundesliga, all leagues below dropped one tier. In 2012, the number of Regionalligas was increased from three to five with all Regionalliga Süd clubs except the Bavarian ones entering the new Regionalliga Südwest.

Key

Players

Current squad

References

External links
 
SC Freiburg II at Weltfussball.de 

II
German reserve football teams
Baden-Württemberg reserve football teams
Football clubs in Germany
3. Liga clubs
Sport in Freiburg im Breisgau